Tanimuca, or Tanimuca-Retuarã (Letuama), is a Tucanoan language of Colombia.

References

Languages of Colombia
Tucanoan languages